Samsui Women (Simplified Chinese: 红头巾, Traditional Chinese: 紅頭巾, literally "The Red Bandana") is a 24-episode historical drama produced by the Singapore Broadcasting Corporation in 1986. Starring Zeng Huifen, Huang Wenyong, Hong Huifang and Li Yinzhu. It details the travails of the Samsui women, who came from Sanshui, China to Singapore in search of work in the construction industry, and whose hard work have helped shape Singapore for years.

Together with The Awakening, it is considered one of the greatest dramas produced by the SBC and catapulted veteran actress Zeng Huifen to stardom with her role as the hardworking and kind Ah Gui. The theme song was voted one of the top 5 favourite drama theme songs at the Star Awards 2007 25th anniversary special.

Cast
Zeng Huifen as Dai Ah Gui
Hong Huifang as Dai Ah Xiu
Huang Wenyong as Su Ah Zhi
Li Wenhai as Ah Long
Li Yinzhu as Ying Jie
Wang Xiang Qin as Ah Bing
Liao Lili as Ah Jin
Li Peijiao as Ah Yin
Steven Woon as Ah Zhi's Grandfather
Yang Lina as Ah Jiao
Bhumi Paul as Zhuang Haolin
Li Yongci as Zhuang Quan
 Chen Meng as Mrs Zhuang
Chong Kwong Fatt as Cheng Er Niu
Tang Hu as Yi Ding Zhi

Production 
The production team attempted to find the Samsui women to interview them about the past but could not locate them as they had mostly left their previous known living places in Chinatown, Singapore and only a few samsui women continued to work at constructions sites. The team approached the Sanshui clan association which the samsui women are part of. Interviews with them remained difficult as they refused to talk much about their past.

Release

Broadcast 
The show runs from 6 May to 13 June 1986.

References

External links
 Samsui Women on Toggle

Singapore Chinese dramas
1986 Singaporean television series debuts
1986 Singaporean television series endings
1980s Singaporean television series
Channel 8 (Singapore) original programming